Álberis Sérgio Ângelo da Silva (born 2 December 1984) is a Brazilian footballer who plays as a defender.

References

External links

1984 births
Living people
Association football defenders
Brazilian footballers
Brazilian expatriate footballers
Åtvidabergs FF players
Allsvenskan players
Superettan players
Expatriate footballers in Sweden
FC Linköping City players